Gnathaphanus melbournensis is a species of ground beetle in the family Carabidae. It is found in Australia and New Zealand.

References

Harpalinae